Cecilie Manz (born 1972) is a Danish industrial designer. In November 2017, Manz was awarded designer of the year in the Design Awards by Bo bedre, Costume Living, Nordic Living and Boligmagasiet. In September 2014, she won the Danish Crown Prince Couple's Culture Award (Kronprinsparrets Kulturpris) for her contribution to design. 

Her work of includes furniture, jewellery, lamps and sculptures. Her Mikado table has been included in MOMA's design collection.

Early life
Cecilie Manz was born in 1972 in Denmark's Odsherred region on the island of Zealand. She was admitted to the Danish Design School in Copenhagen and went to Helsinki as an exchange student, studying at the Finnish School of Art and Design, before she graduated in 1997. She then worked briefly in Professor Yrjö Wiherheimo's studio in Helsinki before returning to Copenhagen where she founded her own Manz Lab in 1998.

Designs

Manz has designed for brands such as Lightyears, Holmegaard, Nils Holger Moormann, Fredericia Furniture, Fritz Hansen, Muuto and Mooment.

Some of her most known designs include the Caravaggio lamp for Lightyears and the Mikado table.

More recently, she has worked with Bang & Olufsen designing the functional but retro-looking speaker line of BeoLit AirPlay speakers and the BeoPlay Bluetooth speaker lineup for the company.

In awarding her the Crown Prince Couple's Culture Prize in 2014, Prince Frederik commented: "The fascinating thing about Cecilie Manz's design is that despite the diversity of her work, there is a clearly discernible tone. The basic idea is always strong in Manz's design, evoking associations with historical realisations in design while clearly reflecting the present."

Awards and recognition
 2004: 3-years work grant, Danish Arts Foundation
 2004: Danish Design Award
 Forum +1 Award
 2007 iF product design award
 2007 Finn Juhl Prize
 2008 Danish Design Award
 2014 Danish Crown Prince Couple's Culture Prize
2017 Designer of the year, Design Awards 2017, Bo Bedre, Costume Living, Nordic Living, Boligmagasinet

Exhibitions

Solo exhibitions
 Cecilie Manz – Status, Danish Design Center, Copenhagen

Group exhibitions
 Walk the Plank I + II, Danish Museum of Art & Design, Copenhagen (1999 and 2003)
  Living in Motion, Vitra Design Museum, Basel (2002
 Northern Lights, MDS-G Miyake Design Studio Gallery, Tokyo (2004
 Grand Danois, Zona Tortona., Milan Furniture Fair, Milan (2008)
 Mindcraft, 100 Design, London (2008)
 Shh…Craft is Golden!, Zona Tortona., Milan Furniture Fair, Milan (2009)

References

External links

 Official website

Danish industrial designers
Danish furniture designers
Danish women designers
1972 births
Living people
Recipients of the Crown Prince Couple's Culture Prize
Designers from Copenhagen
People from Odsherred Municipality